The 1999–2000 FA Premier League (known as the FA Carling Premiership for sponsorship reasons) was the eighth season of the FA Premier League, and Manchester United secured their sixth Premiership title. Like the previous season, they lost only three league games all season. Unlike in 1998–99 season, they won by a comfortable margin – 18 points as opposed to a single point.

Their only disappointment of the season came when they lost their defence of the European Cup following a 3–2 defeat against Real Madrid in the quarter finals. Manchester United had withdrawn from the 1999–2000 FA Cup to participate in the FIFA World Club Championship at the request of the FA who wanted Manchester United to compete to support England's bid to host the World Cup. Chelsea won the last FA Cup held at Wembley Stadium before its redevelopment. The League Cup final was won by Leicester City, for the second time in four seasons. In Europe, Leeds United reached the UEFA Cup semi final and Arsenal were on the losing side to Galatasaray in the UEFA Cup final.

Only one newly promoted team suffered relegation: Watford, who finished in last place, and achieved a record Premiership low of just 24 points (a record since broken by Sunderland (twice), Derby County, Aston Villa, Huddersfield Town, Norwich City, and Sheffield United), despite a decent start to their campaign which saw them beat both Liverpool (at Anfield) and Chelsea. The most successful promoted team was Sunderland, who finished seventh in the final table and spent much of the season pushing for a place in European competition. Bradford City, back in the top division for the first time since 1922, secured their Premiership survival on the last day of the season with a 1–0 win over Liverpool. The result meant that Liverpool lost out on a Champions League place, and Wimbledon were relegated after 14 years of top-division football. Second-from-bottom Sheffield Wednesday were relegated in their penultimate game of the season, having spent 15 of the previous 16 seasons in the top division. Wednesday's season included an 8–0 defeat at Newcastle. Amazingly Coventry City went all season without an away win but still managed to secure 14th place due to an impressive home record which saw them win 12 out of their 19 matches.

As well as Premiership champions Manchester United and runners-up Arsenal, third placed Leeds United qualified for the 2000–01 Champions League. UEFA Cup places went to fourth placed Liverpool, F.A Cup winners Chelsea, and League Cup winners Leicester City.

Promoted to the Premiership for 2000–01 were First Division champions Charlton Athletic, runners-up Manchester City and playoff winners Ipswich Town. For the first time since the formation of the Premiership, all of the promoted teams had been members of the Premiership before.

Teams
Twenty teams competed in the league – the top seventeen teams from the previous season and the three teams promoted from the First Division. The promoted teams were Sunderland, Bradford City and Watford, returning after absences of two, seventy-seven and eleven years respectively. This was also both Bradford City and Watford's first season in the Premier League. They replaced Charlton Athletic, Blackburn Rovers and Nottingham Forest. Charlton Athletic and Nottingham Forest were immediately relegated after a season's presence while Blackburn Rovers' seven-year top flight spell came to an end.

Stadiums and locations

Personnel and kits
(as of 14 May 2000)

 1 The Dreamcast logo appeared on Arsenal's home shirt while the Sega logo appeared on their away shirt.

Managerial changes

League table

Results

Season statistics

Scoring

Top scorers

Hat-tricks 

Note: 5 Player scored 5 goals; 4 Player scored 4 goals; P Player scored a perfect hat-trick; (H) – Home; (A) – Away

Top assists

Awards

Monthly awards

Annual awards

References

External links
 1999–2000 FA Premier League Season at RSSSF

 
Premier League seasons
Eng
1